F1 22 is a racing video game developed by Codemasters and published by EA Sports. It is the thirteenth entry in the F1 series by Codemasters. The game holds an official license of the 2022 Formula One and Formula 2 championships. The game was released for PlayStation 4, PlayStation 5, Windows, Xbox One, and Xbox Series X/S on 1 July 2022. It would also make its debut on EA's Origin platform as their main platform, which is also playable in the EA Desktop app, as well as the Epic Games Store. In previous entries, Steam was the only platform available for PC players. The game received mostly positive reviews from critics, with most criticism aimed at the lack of innovation compared to previous titles and the new "F1 Life" mode.

Gameplay 
Due to new technical regulations for the 2022 Formula One World Championship, F1 22 features new car models with updated physics. The game also features an updated track list, including the revised layouts of Circuit de Barcelona-Catalunya for the Spanish Grand Prix, Yas Marina Circuit for the Abu Dhabi Grand Prix and Albert Park Circuit for the Australian Grand Prix, as well as adding the new Miami International Autodrome for the new Miami Grand Prix. The Algarve International Circuit, home of the Portuguese Grand Prix, along with the Shanghai International Circuit, hosting the Chinese Grand Prix, was subsequently added to the game with an update.

Formula One sprints, a new addition to the sport, are also included in the game. F1 22 features adaptive AI, which would adjust the pace of AI cars according to the performance of players to ensure players are competitive from race-to-race. The game also introduces a customisable hub mode called F1 Life to allow players to collect supercars, clothing and accessories. The game is also confirmed to support virtual reality for PC via Oculus Rift, or HTC Vive, virtual reality headsets. F1 22 also features immersive broadcast options, designed after televised Formula One broadcasts, as well as interactive pit stops.

EA and Codemasters also added Supercars to Formula One with "Pirelli Hot Laps", which is accessible through the new "F1 Life" mode, as well as a licensed soundtrack in the main menu. Furthermore, an option to choose either David Croft from Sky Sports or Alex Jacques from Channel 4 as the main English commentator for F1 races is also added.

In a post-launch update, F1 22 features the 2023 Alfa Romeo C43.

Development and release 
F1 22 was revealed on 21 April 2022, with both Codemasters and EA Sports returning to work on the game. It is an official video game of the 2022 Formula One and Formula 2 championships, alongside F1 Manager 2022 of Frontier Developments. The game was launched on 1 July 2022, for PlayStation 4, PlayStation 5, Windows, Xbox One, and Xbox Series X/S platforms via Steam, Epic Games Store and Origin, which is on the weekend of the 2022 British Grand Prix. The Champions Edition of the game was released three days earlier, on 28 June 2022.

Reception 

F1 22 received "generally favorable" reviews, according to review aggregator Metacritic.

Eurogamer praised Codemasters' implementation of simulation elements such as dynamic weather and wrote in favor of their exclusion of porpoising but called the game "overly familiar" and "overly bloated", writing that "there's a feeling 2022's regulations have introduced as many problems as they have fixed, and that the positive impact of the new ruleset will not really be seen for some years to come." GameSpot praised the increased level of player agency, host of assist settings, and the authentic recreation of the new era of Formula One but criticized the lack of iteration, hollow F1 Life mode, and the inclusion of microtransactions. IGN liked the inclusion of the Formula One sprint race format, virtual reality support, and the game's rejuvenation of the franchise's stagnating elements but panned the "vapid" F1 Life mode's replacement of the predecessors' Braking Point mode. Regarding its monetization, the site wrote, "It's probably a sad sign of the times that while previous Formula One games featured iconic cars from the sport's history, F1 22 features an extensive set of ... designer rugs, lounges, and lamps." PC Gamer praised the inclusion of real-world standings updates, sprint races, the skill tree system, damage models, and wealth of player choice but criticized the aging graphics, inconsistent AI, console controls, and lackluster addition of super cars, while noting that "the annual release has not felt this unnecessary since F1 2014."

PCGamesN found itself "dulled to [F1 22's] charms" and lamented the "cumulative fatigue of having been through this experience so many times before in previous iterations, and having so little meaningful new content in F1 22 to relieve it." Polygon stated that "F1 22 is not [a transformative work], but it did not need to be one — creating new cars, and the organic challenge of learning how to drive them on the limit, was transformation enough." Push Square gave praise to the quality handling, good visuals, deep career modes, novel supercars, and robust customization while criticizing the numerous bugs, crashes, and screen tearing, as well as the aging game engine and insubstantial F1 Life mode. Shacknews lauded the overhauled racetracks, new circuits, remixed audio, new commentary, VR support, and the integration of new regulations and car designs but disliked the "terrible" feel of the supercars, difficult AI, and persistent series issues. The Guardian gave the game a score of 3/5 stars and wrote, "F1 22 is technically stunning, and that, combined with the chance to drive this year’s cars on this year’s tracks, should make it irresistible to Formula One fans. As long as they manage to ignore the egregious F1 Life."

The game topped in the United Kingdom sales charts.

Notes

References

External links 

 
 

Codemasters games
EA Sports games
Electronic Arts games
Ego (game engine) games
Split-screen multiplayer games
Esports games
F1 (video game series)
Multiplayer and single-player video games
PlayStation 4 games
PlayStation 5 games
Racing video games
2022 video games
Video games set in 2022
Video games set in Australia
Video games set in Austria
Video games set in Azerbaijan
Video games set in Bahrain
Video games set in Belgium
Video games set in Brazil
Video games set in Canada
Video games set in France
Video games set in Hungary
Video games set in Italy
Video games set in Japan
Video games set in Mexico
Video games set in Miami
Video games set in Monaco
Video games set in the Netherlands
Video games set in Portugal
Sports video games set in Saudi Arabia
Video games set in Singapore
Video games set in Spain
Video games set in Texas
Video games set in the United Arab Emirates
Video games set in England
Windows games
Xbox One games
Xbox Series X and Series S games
Video games developed in the United Kingdom